John Scurlock, known as Little John or L. J., was an editor and politician in Mississippi. He was reported to be 7 feet tall. He was murdered by the Ku Klux Klan.

He was born in Mississippi. Scurlock was a member of Coffeeville, Mississippi's Board of Aldermen and was an important leader in Yalobusha County's African American community. He lost an election to serve in the state legislature in 1872.

He served as a "Book Agent" and assistant editor of the Christian Index newspaper. In 1876 he became a trustee of Tougaloo College.

Further reading
"Reconstruction in Yalobusha and Grenada Counties" by Julia C. Brown, Publications of the Mississippi Historical Society, 12, 1912 pages 227, 228, 234, and 242

References

Mississippi politicians

Year of birth missing (living people)
Living people